Psalm 122  is the 122nd psalm of the Book of Psalms, beginning in English in the King James Version: "I was glad" and in Latin entitled Laetatus sum. It is attributed to King David and one of the fifteen psalms described as A song of ascents (Shir Hama'alot). Its title, I was glad, is reflected in a number of choral introits by various composers.

In the slightly different numbering system used in the Greek Septuagint and Latin Vulgate translations of the Bible, this psalm is Psalm 121.

Text

Hebrew Bible version
Following is the Hebrew text of Psalm 122:

King James Version
 Our feet shall stand within thy gates, O Jerusalem. 
 Jerusalem is builded as a city that is compact together: 
 For there are set thrones of judgment, the thrones of the house of David. 
 Pray for the peace of Jerusalem: they shall prosper that love thee. 
 Peace be within thy walls, and prosperity within thy palaces. 
 For my brethren and companions' sakes, I will now say, Peace be within thee. 
 Because of the house of the  our God I will seek thy good.

Purpose
The psalm is attributed to King David; however, Alexander Kirkpatrick suggests that its author lived "in the country, at a distance from Jerusalem. He recalls the joy with which he heard the invitation of his neighbours to join the company of pilgrims". He adds, "the psalm may best be explained thus, as the meditation of a pilgrim who, after returning to the quiet of his home, reflects upon the happy memories of his pilgrimage."

Uses

Judaism
Psalm 122 is recited following Mincha between Sukkot and Shabbat Hagadol. It is also recited on Shabbat Nachamu (the Shabbat after Tisha B'Av) in some traditions.

It is recited on Yom Yerushalayim in the Conservative Jewish tradition due to the psalmist speaking of a united Jerusalem.

Verses 7–9 are part of Talmud Brachos 64a.

Orthodoxy
As one of the Songs of Ascents (known in the Orthodox Church as the Eighteenth Kathisma), the Psalm is read towards the start of Vespers on weekdays during the 1st, 2nd, 3rd, 4th and 6th weeks of Great Lent, between September 22 and December 19, between January 15 and The Sunday of the Prodigal Son, and on all Fridays except Good Friday, except when these days either form part of an All-night vigil or fall the day after one.

Catholic Church
According to the rule of St. Benedict set to 530, this Psalm was traditionally performed during the third act of the week, that is to say Tuesday – Saturday after Psalm 120 (119) and Psalm 121 (120).

In the Liturgy of the Hours today, Psalm 122 is recited or sung at Vespers on Saturday of the fourth week.  In the liturgy of the Mass, it is recited on the feast of Christ the King, the first Sunday of Advent in year A and the 34th Sunday in Ordinary Time in year C.

Anglicanism
In the Book of Common Prayer, Psalm 122 is to be said or sung on Day 27 at Morning Prayer.

Verse 1 is used in the introit for Mothering Sunday which coincides with Laetare Sunday, also called "Mid-Lent Sunday" or Refreshment Sunday.

Architecture
Verse 6, Pray for the Peace of Jerusalem, is reflected in a sculpture by Dani Karavan in the wall of the Knesset building in Jerusalem.

Musical settings

Monteverdi set the Latin (Vulgate) text, Laetatus sum, at least three times, in his Vespro della Beata Vergine of 1610 and twice as a stand-alone motet in 1643. 
Charpentier set the same text in 1671, again as a motet, catalogued as H.161, for soloists, chorus, flutes, strings and continuo. In 1690, he set another "Laetatus sum" H.216, for soloists, chorus, 2 treble instruments and continuo.
Jommelli did the same, in 1743.
An abridged form of the Book of Common Prayer translation, I was glad, is used in Parry's 1902 coronation anthem of that name. 
The same English text was used for coronation music by Henry Purcell, William Boyce, Thomas Attwood and others.
Herbert Howells set verses 6 and 7 in his anthem "O, pray for the peace of Jerusalem."
In 1676 Biber conceives a name piece (C.9) to Salzburg. In 1693, Michel-Richard Delalande wrote his grand motet (S.47), but unfortunately, today lost. 
Jules Van Nuffel set the psalm in Latin, Laetatus sum, for mixed choir and organ in 1935.
In the Liturgy of the Hours of the Catholic Church (the Divine Office), in Latin, Laetatus sum is chanted in Mode VII.

References

External links 

 
 
 Text of Psalm 122 according to the 1928 Psalter
 Psalms Chapter 122 text in Hebrew and English, mechon-mamre.org
 A song of ascents. Of David. / I rejoiced when they said to me, “Let us go to the house of the LORD" text and footnotes, usccb.org United States Conference of Catholic Bishops
 Psalm 122:1 introduction and text, biblestudytools.com
 Psalm 122 – Coming to the House of the LORD and the City of God enduringword.com
 Psalm 122 / Refrain: How lovely is your dwelling place, O Lord of hosts. Church of England
 Psalm 122 at biblegateway.com

122
Works attributed to David